Lee Haxall is an American film and television editor.  Haxall won a 1997 CableACE Award for Editing a Comedy/Music Special or Series for Arli$$ and a 2004 Primetime Emmy Award for Outstanding Single-Camera Picture Editing for a Comedy Series for the pilot episode of Arrested Development.  Haxall has also edited several high-profile motion pictures such as Meet the Fockers, The Dukes of Hazzard, Beerfest, Take Me Home Tonight and Crazy, Stupid, Love.  Haxall received an MFA in Cinema Production from the University of Southern California and worked in the sound department on films like Dune and Night of the Demons before moving into film editing.

Filmography

References

External links

American film editors
Living people
Year of birth missing (living people)
USC School of Cinematic Arts alumni
Place of birth missing (living people)
American television editors